Covelas is a Portuguese Freguesia in the Municipality of Póvoa de Lanhoso, with an area of 2.84 km² and 416 inhabitants (2011). It has a population density of 146.5 people per km².

Population

References 

Freguesias of Póvoa de Lanhoso